The Senegal women's national handball team is the national team of Senegal. It is governed by the Fédération Sénégalaise de Handball and takes part in international handball competitions.

Results

World Championship
2019 – 18th
2023 – Qualified

African Championship
1974 – 2nd
1976 – 5th
1985 – 8th
1991 – 5th
1992 – 6th
2000 – 7th
2012 – 8th
2014 – 6th
2016 – Disqualified
2018 – 2nd
2021 – 5th
2022 – 4th

Current squad
Squad for the 2019 World Women's Handball Championship.

Head coach: Frédéric Bougeant

References

External links
IHF profile

Women's national handball teams
Handball
National team